The year 1893 in architecture, involved some significant architectural events and new buildings.

Events
 May 1 – The World's Columbian Exposition, including 600 temporary buildings, opens to the public in Chicago, USA.

Buildings and structures

Buildings completed

 Juliusz Słowacki Theatre, Kraków, Poland, designed by Jan Zawiejski, opened as the Teatr Miejski on October 21.
 Museum for the Macedonian Struggle (Thessaloniki)
 Refinery for Pacific Coast Borax Company, the first reinforced concrete building in the United States.
 Salt Lake Temple in Salt Lake City, Utah, United States.
 St. Mary's Cathedral in Glasgow, Scotland, UK.
 St. Michael the Archangel Church in Kaunas, Lithuania.
 Saint-Pierre-le-Jeune Catholic Church in Strasbourg, France, completed.
 Château Frontenac hotel for Canadian Pacific Railway in Old Quebec, designed by Bruce Price, opened on December 18.
 Broad Street Station, Philadelphia, Pennsylvania, USA, designed by Frank Furness and the largest passenger railroad terminal in the world at this time.
 Reconstruction of Ramsay Garden, Edinburgh, Scotland, by Patrick Geddes, Stewart Henbest Capper and Sydney Mitchell.
 Bradbury Building in Los Angeles, California, United States.

Awards
 RIBA Royal Gold Medal – Richard Morris Hunt.
 Grand Prix de Rome, architecture: François-Benjamin Chaussemiche.

Births
 February 14 – Kay Fisker, Danish architect, designer and educator (died 1965)
 May 19 – Gudolf Blakstad, Norwegian architect (died 1985)
 June 1 – Otto Eisler, Czech architect (died 1968)
 September 15 – Rene Paul Chambellan, American architectural sculptor (died 1955)
 September 20 – Hans Scharoun, German architect (died 1972)
 September 27 – Ad van der Steur, Dutch architect (died 1953)

Deaths
 February 6 – Jacob Weidenmann, American landscape architect (born 1829)
 February 24 – Francis Fowler, English architect (born c. 1819)
 April 18 – Richard Carpenter, English Gothic Revival architect (born 1841)

References